Rowland Winn, 2nd Baron St Oswald (1 August 1857 – 13 April 1919) was a Conservative Party politician in England.

At the 1885 general election, he was elected as Member of Parliament for Pontefract in Yorkshire. He held the seat until his father's death in 1893, when he succeeded to the peerage as Baron St Oswald.

He married Mabel Susan Forbes in October 1892. Their eldest son Rowland George Winn became 3rd Baron St Oswald.

Notes

External links
 

Saint Oswald, Rowland Winn, 1st Baron
Conservative Party (UK) MPs for English constituencies
UK MPs 1885–1886
UK MPs 1886–1892
UK MPs 1892–1895
Saint Oswald, B2
1857 births
1919 deaths